Sutton Forest is a small village in the Southern Highlands, New South Wales, Australia in Wingecarribee Shire. It is located 5 km southwest of Moss Vale on the Illawarra Highway. Sutton Forest was originally granted, then owned by Navy Chief officer, Captain John Nicholson who recently immigrated from Scotland to Australia. This privately owned estate was originally 700 acres, this is where John Nicholson lived and died.

Sutton Forest is located in an agrarian setting and is surrounded by farms, vineyards and is home to manor homes and estates. It is in one of the oldest areas settled by Europeans in Australia after Sydney and is somewhat reminiscent of an English village due to the temperate Southern Highlands climate and high rainfall.

Sutton Forest comprises two churches, an inn, and two specialty shops.

In 2004, a proposal to locate Sydney's second airport in Sutton Forest met with fierce opposition from locals.

It was one of the first colonial settlements outside Sydney and thus has many heritage buildings such as the Hillview Heritage Hotel which was built in 1850s.

Etymology
In 1819 it was named by Governor Lachlan Macquarie after Charles Manners-Sutton, 1st Viscount Canterbury, a speaker of the House of Commons. The surrounding area is part of the lands administrative unit of the Sutton Forest Parish.

Population
The most common responses for religion were Anglican 33.5%, Catholic 23.5% and no religion 22.0%.

At the 2021 census, 504 people were recorded at Sutton Forrest.

Churches
 All Saints' Anglican Church and Churchyard
 St Patrick's Roman Catholic Church and Churchyard

Hotels
Sutton Forest Inn and Bistro
Peppers Manor House, Sutton Forest also known as Mount Broughton.

School
 Sutton Forest Public School

Heritage listings
Sutton Forest has a number of heritage-listed sites, including:
 Golden Vale Road: Golden Vale
 Old Illawarra Highway: Hillview
 217 Oldbury Road: Whitley

Notable residents
Nicole Kidman and Keith Urban own Bunya Hill, a 45 hectare estate and cattle stud farm within the village.

References

 Exploring the ACT and Southeast New South Wales, J. Kay McDonald, Kangaroo Press, Sydney, 1985

External links

 Sutton Forest

 
Towns of the Southern Highlands (New South Wales)
Hume Highway
Wingecarribee Shire